How Do You View? was the first comedy series on British television. The programme was based on an on-screen persona of Terry-Thomas as "a glamorous, mischievous and discreetly cash-strapped man-about-town", introducing a series of sketches in which he also appeared, alongside Peter Butterworth as his chauffeur; Janet Brown (Butterworth's real life wife); Avril Angers; H.C. Walton as the family retainer, Moulting, and Diana Dors, as 'Cuddles', in the six episodes of series four. The programme was broadcast live and often included Terry-Thomas walking through control rooms and corridors of the BBC's Lime Grove and Alexandra Palace studios.

The series is described by the author and historian Mark Lewisohn as being "inventive ... truly televisual and not just a radio programme in costume".

Series history
Series one: 26 October – 21 December 1949
Series two: 5 April – 17 May 1950
Series three: 8 November 1950 – 28 February 1951
Series four: 19 September – 28 November 1951
Series five: 2 April – 11 June 1952
Special: 9 September 1953

Notes and references

Bibliography

BBC television comedy
1940s British television series
1950s British comedy television series
1949 British television series debuts
1953 British television series endings